James Robert Hooper (July 27, 1936 – January 24, 2008) was an American politician who served on the Maryland Senate from 1999 to 2007.

Education
Hooper attended Bel Air High School in Bel Air, Maryland.

Career
Hooper owned Harford Sanitation Services, which he founded with his father in 1954 and was operated after his death until its sale by his son Bobby Ray Hooper and his daughter, Cindy Hushon. He was a member of the Harford County, Aberdeen and Havre de Grace Chambers of Commerce, as well as the Route 40 Business Association. He also served on the Board of Directors for the Salvation Army of Harford County from 1986 until his death.

Political career
Hooper served as a member of the Harford County Council from 1982 until 1990.

Hooper was elected to the Maryland state senate in 1998. He was sworn in on January 13, 1999, to represent District 35 in Harford County.  The hallmark of his work was constituent service.

Hooper announced on November 14, 2007, that he was resigning his Senate seat due to poor health. The resignation took effect on December 31, 2007. He recommended and was replaced by State Delegate Barry Glassman.

Hooper was lovingly known among the Senate's Pages as Senator "High Five" Hooper because he would walk into session every day and run down the line of pages and give them high-fives.  He was even known to do this among his fellow senators.  Hooper's unique way of saying hello at the beginning of a session put a smile on everyone's faces.

Hooper succumbed to colon cancer on January 24, 2008, at his home in Street, Maryland. He was 71 years old.

Election results
2006 Race for Maryland State Senate – 35th District
Voters to choose three:
{| class="wikitable"
|-
!Name
!Votes
!Percent
!Outcome
|-
|-
|J. Robert Hooper, Rep.
|35,760
|  68.0%
|   Won
|-
|-
|Stan Kollar, Dem.
|16,803
|  31.9%
|   Lost
|-
|Write In's, Other
|31
|  0.3%
|   Lost
|}

2002 Race for Maryland State Senate – 35th District
Voters to choose three:
{| class="wikitable"
|-
!Name
!Votes
!Percent
!Outcome
|-
|-
|J. Robert Hooper, Rep.
|42,766
|  98.13%
|   Won
|-
|Write In's, Other
|817
|  1.87%
|   Lost
|}

1998 Race for Maryland State Senate – 35th District
Voters to choose three:
{| class="wikitable"
|-
!Name
!Votes
!Percent
!Outcome
|-
|-
|J. Robert Hooper, Rep.
|22,741
|  55%
|   Won
|-
|-
|Donald C. Fry, Dem.
|18,370
|  45%
|   Lost
|}

References

External links
Official Biography from the Maryland Manual On-Line
Campaign Website

1936 births
2008 deaths
Republican Party Maryland state senators
Deaths from colorectal cancer
People from Bel Air, Maryland
Politicians from Baltimore
Deaths from cancer in Maryland
People from Harford County, Maryland
20th-century American politicians
21st-century American politicians